Forty-five of the 102 Mayflower passengers died in the winter of 1620–21, and the Mayflower colonists suffered greatly during their first winter in the New World from lack of shelter, scurvy, and general conditions on board ship. They were buried on Cole's Hill.
Robert Carter*, after February 21
James Chilton*, 8/18 on board Mayflower in Cape Cod Harbor. Most likely buried ashore. Memorial in Provincetown.  Signer of the Mayflower Compact.
Richard Clarke*
John Crackstone Sr.*
Thomas English* hired to master a shallop but died in the winter.
Moses Fletcher*
Edward Fuller*
John Goodman*, there are conflicting reports regarding Goodman's death, with records of his name appearing in 1623
William Holbeck*
John Langmore*
Edmund Margesson*
Christopher Martin*, January 8
 William Mullins*' February 21
Degory Priest*, January 1
John Rigsdale*
Thomas Rogers*
Elias Story*
Edward Thompson, December 4/14 on board Mayflower in Cape Cod Harbor. Most likely buried ashore. Memorial in Provincetown.
Edward Tilley*
John Tilley*
Thomas Tinker*
John Turner*
William White*, February 21, 1621.
Roger Wilder*
Thomas Williams*

Women
Mary (Norris) Allerton*, of Newbury, England, wife of Isaac Allerton, died February 25, 1621, reportedly in childbirth, baby was stillborn. Remains later interred in Pilgrim Memorial Tomb, Cole's Hill, Plymouth, Massachusetts
Dorothy (May) Bradford, December 7/17 drowned while the Mayflower was anchored in Cape Cod Harbor; her body was never recovered; memorial in Provincetown
Mrs. James Chilton*
Sarah Eaton*
Mrs. Edward Fuller*
Mary (Prower) Martin*
Alice Mullins*, February 22–28
Alice Rigsdale*
Agnes (Cooper) Tilley*
Joan (Hurst) Tilley*
Mrs. Thomas Tinker*
Elizabeth (Barker) Winslow*, March 24. Remains later interred in Pilgrim Memorial Tomb, Cole's Hill, Plymouth, Massachusetts
Rose Standish* January 29
Isabela Fernandes* December 22

Children

Elinor (Ellen) More, age 8 died in Plymouth January 1621. She died of the disease pneumonia. Name is on the Pilgrim Memorial Tomb, Cole's Hill, Plymouth, Massachusetts. 
Jasper More, age 7, died on board the Mayflower on December 6, 1620. Buried ashore in the Provincetown area. 
Mary More, age 4 died in the winter of 1620. Location of her remains unknown.  Name is represented on the Pilgrim Memorial Tomb, Plymouth, Massachusetts. 
Joseph Mullins*, age 14, February 22–28
Solomon Prower*, age ca. 14-17, December 24
the son of Thomas Tinker*
both sons of John Turner*

Statistics by month

Winter
According to Bradford's Register, a contemporary source

November, 1
December, 6
January, 8 
February, 17
March, 13

Spring
April uncertain, between 1 and 5 (including Governor John Carver, not in above list)
May or June, at least 1 (Mrs. Katherine (White) Carver*, not in above list)

Four deaths occurred in the months before the first Thanksgiving, bringing the total deaths to between 51 and 56.

See also
List of Mayflower passengers who died at sea November/December 1620

Notes
The article is based on the List of deaths and dates as shown in Chronological History of New England by Thomas Prince in 1737, from the register of deaths compiled by William Bradford, which was lost during the Revolutionary War. The list can be seen in the article "Mayflower passenger deaths, 1620-1621".

References

Further reading
 Glenn Alan Cheney. Thanksgiving: The Pilgrims' First Year in America, (New London: New London Librarium, 2007) 
 Nathaniel Philbrick, Nathaniel. Mayflower: A Story of Courage, Community, and War, (New York: Viking, 2006) 
 Women on the Mayflower, MayflowerHistory.com, accessed August 29, 2006.

Died in the winter of 1620-1621
Death in the United States-related lists

hu:Mayflower